The  ("Trust agency"), colloquially referred to as , was an agency established by the government of the German Democratic Republic to reprivatise/privatise East German enterprises, Volkseigene Betriebe (VEBs), prior to German reunification. Created by the Volkskammer on 17 June 1990, it oversaw the restructure and sale of about 8,500 state-owned companies with over four million employees. At that time, it was the world's largest industrial enterprise, controlling everything from steel works to the Babelsberg Studios.

Responsibilities
The Treuhand was responsible for more than just the 8,500 state-owned enterprises. It also took over around 2.4 million hectares of agricultural land and forests, the property of the former Stasi, large parts of the property of the former National People's Army, large-scale public housing property, and the property of the state pharmacy network.

On the day of reunification, 3 October 1990, it took over the property of the political parties and the mass organisations of the German Democratic Republic.

Opposition

Its operations drew criticism for unnecessarily closing allegedly profitable businesses, misuse and waste of funds and layoffs that were claimed to be unnecessary. It also drew substantial protest from the workforces affected, as 2.5 million employees in state-owned enterprises (out of 4 million in total) were laid off in the early 1990s. Supporters argued that not placing the former state-owned enterprises into private hands would have caused the loss of many more jobs and slowed economic recovery.

On 1 April 1991, chairman of the Treuhand Detlev Karsten Rohwedder was shot dead by an unknown assassin (possibly the Red Army Faction).
He was succeeded by Birgit Breuel.

When its operations ended in 1994, it had amassed 260 to 270 billion DM in debt.

Successors

Although the Treuhand ceased operations in 1994, it still retained much property and some other legal responsibilities. These were transferred to three successor agencies: 
 the Bundesanstalt für vereinigungsbedingte Sonderaufgaben, BvS (Federal Agency for Unification-related Special Tasks), which managed remaining state-owned enterprises;
 the Treuhandliegenschaftsgesellschaft (now TLG Immobilien GmbH), which manages the remaining state-owned urban and industrial real estate;
 the Bodenverwertungs- und -verwaltungs GmbH (BVVG), a subsidiary of the Treuhand created in 1992, which manages the state-owned agricultural land, forest lands, and related real estate.

The BvS ceased operations at the end of 2000, but it remains legally in existence; its remaining tasks are all delegated to other bodies. TLG and BVVG remain the largest real estate owners in the new federal states. In 2000, TLG was reoriented from focussing on privatisation of its assets to "active portfolio management" with a view to making profits for the German federal government. By 2007, having sold 45,000 properties in six years and reinvested 1.5 billion euros, it was still managing 1500 properties worth 1.4 billion euros. The planned privatisation of TLG itself was put on hold in July 2008 because of adverse economic conditions. In January 2020, TLG Immobilien was acquired by the Luxembourg-domiciled property company Aroundtown SA.

Total land sales amounted to around half the area of the state of Saxony-Anhalt.

References

Further reading

 Mark Cassell, How Governments Privatize: the Politics of Divestment in the United States and Germany, Georgetown University Press, 2002.
 Vladimiro Giacché, Anschluss: Die deutsche Vereinigung und die Zukunft Europas, Laika-Verlag, Hamburg 2014, German Edition, .

Economy of East Germany
1990 establishments in East Germany
Privatization funds